Robert Metcalfe or Robert Metcalf may refer to:

 Robert Metcalfe, American engineer and entrepreneur
 Robert Metcalfe (Hebraist), English priest and professor of Hebrew
 Robert L. Metcalf, American entomologist
 Robert Metcalf, English priest and archdeacon of Liverpool